The Hikari Kikan was the Imperial Japanese liaison office responsible for Japanese relations with the Azad Hind Government that replaced the I Kikan. It was initially headed by Colonel Bin Yamamoto, later replaced by Major General Saburo Isoda.

The Hikari Kikan recruited Ceylonese, Indians, and other South Asians domiciled in Japanese-occupied British Malaya and Singapore for espionage missions against the Allies during World War II.

See also

References
Chandra Bose to Nihon. By Joyce C. Lebra; Horie Yoshitaka; Fujiwara Iwaichi. Tokyo. Hara Shobo. 1968.
Four Lankans die in secret 'independence' war, Janaka Perera

South-East Asian theatre of World War II
Indian National Army
Imperial Japanese Army
Defunct Japanese intelligence agencies